The 2013–14 Basketligan season was the 21st season of the Basketligan, the highest professional basketball league in Sweden. Södertälje Kings successfully defended their title by winning the Finals 4–3 over Norrköping Dolphins.

Regular season

1 Teams were awarded 2 points for a win and 0 for a loss.

Playoffs
Different from last year, the semi-finals were played in a best-of-seven format.

References

Basketligan seasons
Sweden
Basketligan